Georgina Willis is a film director who was born in Australia and now lives in London. Georgina's first feature, Watermark (2003), made its debut in the Cannes Film Festival. It was the first independent film to be included in Cannes. Her production company, Potoroo Films, is now based in London. Georgina Willis's and producer Kerry Rock's work became some of the most prominent at international festivals being shown at over eighty international festivals and receiving many awards for their work. Georgina has recently been accepted as a member of the Directors Guild of Great Britain.
Georgina Willis founded the London Image Festival. 

https://www.quinzaine-realisateurs.com/en/realisateur/georgina-willis-en/

External links
 https://m.festival-cannes.com/en/artist/georgina-willisPotoroo Films
 https://www.quinzaine-realisateurs.com/en/realisateur/georgina-willis-en/
Watermark (film website)
 

Living people
Year of birth missing (living people)
Australian film directors
Australian women film directors